Heard County is a county located in the west central portion of the U.S. state of Georgia. At the 2020 census, the population was 11,412, down from 11,834 in 2010. The county seat is Franklin. The county was created on December 22, 1830.

Heard County is included in the Atlanta-Sandy Springs-Roswell, GA Metropolitan Statistical Area.

History
Heard County was created by Act of the Legislature on December 22, 1830. It was named for Stephen Heard, elected President of the Council on February 18, 1781, thus, in the absence of Governor Howley, becoming Governor de facto. Heard moved to Wilkes County from Hanover County, Virginia, and fought in the American Revolutionary War where he distinguished himself at Kettle Creek. The first Sheriff, Jonathan Mewsick, was commissioned in 1832.

Geography

The vast majority of Heard County is located in the Middle Chattahoochee River-Lake Harding sub-basin of the ACF River Basin (Apalachicola-Chattahoochee-Flint River Basin), with just a very small northwestern corner of the county, west of Ephesus, located in the Upper Tallapoosa River sub-basin of the ACT River Basin (Coosa-Tallapoosa River Basin).

Major highways
  U.S. Route 27
  State Route 1
  State Route 34
  State Route 100
  State Route 219

Adjacent counties
 Carroll County (north)
 Coweta County (east)
 Troup County (south)
 Randolph County, Alabama (west/Central Time border)

Demographics

2000 census
At the 2000 census, there were 11,012 people, 4,043 households and 3,040 families living in the county. The population density was 14/km2 (37/sq mi).  There were 4,512 housing units at an average density of 6/km2 (15/sq mi). The racial make-up was 87.48% White, 10.82% Black or African American, 0.32% Native American, 0.11% Asian, 0.07% Pacific Islander, 0.47% from other races, and 0.73% from two or more races.  1.05% of the population were Hispanic or Latino of any race.

There were 4,043 households, of which 37.70% had children under the age of 18 living with them, 57.90% were married couples living together, 12.10% had a female householder with no husband present and 24.80% were non-families. 21.30% of all households were made up of individuals, and 8.70% had someone living alone who was 65 years of age or older. The average household size was 2.70 and the average family size was 3.12.

28.70% of the population were under the age of 18, 7.60% from 18 to 24, 30.70% from 25 to 44, 22.00% from 45 to 64 and 11.00% who were 65 years of age or older.  The median age was 34 years. For every 100 females, there were 96.50 males. For every 100 females age 18 and over, there were 94.10 males.

The median household income was $33,038 and the median family income was $39,306. Males had a median income of $31,900 and females $22,492. The per capita income was $15,132. About 10.50% of families and 13.60% of the population were below the poverty line, including 14.60% of those under age 18 and 17.40% of those age 65 or over.

2010 census
At the 2010 United States Census, there were 11,834 people, 4,400 households and 3,157 families living in the county. The racial make-up was 86.9% white, 9.8% black or African American, 0.5% Asian, 0.3% American Indian, 0.8% from other races and 1.7% from two or more races. Those of Hispanic or Latino origin made up 1.9% of the population. In terms of ancestry, 16.2% were American, 11.6% were Irish, 9.0% were German, and 7.4% were English.

Of the 4,400 households, 36.2% had children under the age of 18 living with them, 52.5% were married couples living together, 13.6% had a female householder with no husband present, 28.3% were non-families and 23.8% of all households were made up of individuals. The average household size was 2.66 and the average family size was 3.14. The median age was 39.1 years.

The median household income was $42,685 and the median family income was $47,591. Males had a median income of $41,185 and females $31,507. The per capita income was $18,077. About 16.7% of families and 19.8% of the population were below the poverty line, including 32.6% of those under age 18 and 16.4% of those age 65 or over.

2020 census

As of the 2020 United States census, there were 11,412 people, 4,502 households, and 3,254 families residing in the county.

Communities
 Centralhatchee
 Corinth (part)
 Ephesus
 Franklin (county seat)
 Glenn
 Texas

Politics

See also

 National Register of Historic Places listings in Heard County, Georgia
List of counties in Georgia

References

External links
 Heard County historical marker
 Heard County Jail historical marker

 
Georgia (U.S. state) counties
1830 establishments in Georgia (U.S. state)
Populated places established in 1830
Heard
Counties of Appalachia